Why may refer to:

 Causality, a consequential relationship between two events
 Reason (argument), a premise in support of an argument, for what reason or purpose
 Grounding (metaphysics), a topic in metaphysics regarding how things exist in virtue of more fundamental things.
 Why?, one of the Five Ws used in journalism

Music

Artists
 Why? (American band), a hip hop/indie rock band formed in Oakland, California, in 2004
 Yoni Wolf, formerly known by the stage name Why?
 Why (Canadian band), a rock band formed in Winnipeg, Manitoba, in 1993
 Why?, a 1990s UK folk band, two members of which formed Quench in 2001

Albums
 Why (Baby V.O.X album) or the title song, 2000
 Why? (Ginger Baker album) or the title song, 2014
 Why (Prudence Liew album) or the title song, 1987
 Why? (They Might Be Giants album), 2015
 Why?, by Jacob Whitesides, 2016
 Why, by Moahni Moahna, 1996
 Why?, by the MonaLisa Twins, 2022

EPs
 Why (Discharge EP) or the title song, 1981
 Why (Taeyeon EP) or the title song (see below), 2016

Songs
 "Why" (3T song) featuring Michael Jackson, 1996
 "Why" (Andy Gibb song), 1978
 "Why" (Annie Lennox song), 1992; covered by DJ Sammy (2005)
 "Why?" (Bronski Beat song), 1984
 "Why" (The Byrds song), 1966
 "Why" (Carly Simon song), 1982
 "Why" (D Mob song) with Cathy Dennis, 1994
 "Why?" (Earth, Wind & Fire song), 2015
 "Why" (Frankie Avalon song), 1959; covered by Anthony Newley (1960) and Donny Osmond (1972)
 "Why" (Gabrielle song), 2007
 "Why" (Glamma Kid song), 1999
 "Why" (Jadakiss song), 2004
 "Why" (Jason Aldean song), 2005
 "Why" (Jieqiong song), 2018
 "Why" (Lionel Richie song), 2006
 "Why?" (Marika Gombitová song), 1979
 "Why" (Mary J. Blige song) featuring Rick Ross, 2012
 "Why" (Miliyah Kato song), 2009
 "Why?" (Mis-Teeq song), 2001
 "Why" (Rascal Flatts song), 2009
 "Why" (Sabrina Carpenter song), 2017
 "Why" (Sonique song), 2005
 "Why" (Taeyeon song), 2016
 "Why" (Tony Sheridan song) with the Beatles, 1964
 "Why" (Yoko Ono song), 1970
 "Why? (Keep Your Head Down)", by TVXQ, 2011
 "Why (Must We Fall in Love)", by Diana Ross & the Supremes and the Temptations, 1970
 "Why, Why", by Carl Smith, 1957
 "Why, Why, Why", by Billy Currington, 2006
 "Why", by 4Minute from Best of 4Minute, 2012
 "Why", by Air Supply from Mumbo Jumbo, 2010
 "Why?", by Aminé from OnePointFive, 2018
 "Why", by Anastacia from Evolution, 2017
 "Why", by Antique from Die for You, 2001
 "Why", by Average White Band from Cut the Cake, 1975
 "Why" by Avril Lavigne, a B-side of the single "Complicated", 2002
 "Why", by Ayaka from the single "Clap & Love"/"Why" and the theme song of the PSP game Crisis Core: Final Fantasy VII, 2007
 "Why?", by Bazzi from Cosmic, 2018
 "Why", by Basshunter from Bass Generation, 2009
 "Why", by Busted from A Present for Everyone, 2003
 "Why", by Crossfade from Falling Away, 2006
 "Why?", by Des'ree from Dream Soldier, 2003
 "Why! ...", by Enigma from Le Roi Est Mort, Vive Le Roi!, 1996
 "Why", by Fleetwood Mac from Mystery to Me, 1973
 "Why", by Frankie Valli from Closeup, 1975
 "Why?", by Geir Rönning, representing Finland in the Eurovision Song Contest 2005
 "Why", by Godsmack from Awake, 2000
 "Why", by Gotthard from Silver, 2017
 "Why?", by Helloween from Master of the Rings, 1994
 "Why", by Irene Cara from Anyone Can See, 1982
 "Why", by Jamie Walters from Jamie Walters, 1994
 "Why", by Jocelyn Enriquez from All My Life, 2003
 "Why", by Joe Satriani from The Extremist, 1992
 "Why", by Lily Allen a B-side of the single Not Fair, 2009
 "Why", by Limp Bizkit from Greatest Hitz, 2005
 "Why?", by Lonnie Mack from The Wham of that Memphis Man, 1963
 "Why", by Mario from Go!, 2007
 "Why", by Melanie Chisholm from Northern Star, 1999
 "Why", by Natalie Imbruglia from Left of the Middle, 1997
 "Why", by Ne-Yo from Non-Fiction, 2015
 "Why", by NF from The Search, 2019
 "Why?", by Reset, 1997
 "Why", by Rooney, 2016
 "Why", by Roy Woods from Waking at Dawn, 2016
 "Why?", by Secondhand Serenade from A Twist In My Story, 2008
 "Why", by Shawn Mendes from Shawn Mendes, 2018
 "Why?", by the Specials, a B-side of the single "Ghost Town", 1981
 "Why", by Stabbing Westward from Wither Blister Burn & Peel, 1996
 "Why", by Swift from Thoughts Are Thought, 1999
 "Why?", by Tracy Chapman from Tracy Chapman, 1988
 "Why", by Uriah Heep, a B-side of the single "The Wizard", 1972
 "Why?", by Vanilla Ninja from Vanilla Ninja, 2003
 "Why", by Wide Mouth Mason from Where I Started, 1999
 "Why?", by Z-Ro from The Life of Joseph W. McVey, 2004
 "Why", written by Buddy Feyne, notably performed by Nat King Cole, 1954
 "Why", from the musical Tick, tick... BOOM!, 2001
 "Why", from the television series Fraggle Rock
 "Why? (The King of Love Is Dead)", by Nina Simone from 'Nuff Said!, 1968
 "Why (What's Goin' On?)", by the Roots from The Tipping Point, 2004
 "Why Why", by Doja Cat from Planet Her, 2021
 "Why, Why, Why", by Eddie Rabbitt from Songs from Rabbittland, 1998
 "Why, Why, Why", by Underworld, a B-side of the single "Rez", 1993
 "Why? Why? Why? (Is It So Hard)", by Paul Revere & the Raiders from The Spirit of '67, 1966

Other media
 Why (board game), a game based on the television series Alfred Hitchcock Presents
 Why? (film), a 1987 Czech film
 Why? (1971 film), a 1971 short starring O. J. Simpson and Tim Buckley
 Why? (book), a children's book by Tomie dePaola
 "Why?", an episode of the TV series As Time Goes By
 Why? with Hannibal Buress, a Comedy Central television series

Places
 Why, Arizona, an unincorporated community in the United States
 Why, Lakes, South Sudan

Surname
 Alby Why (1899–1969), Australian rugby league footballer
 Jack Why (1903–1944), Australian rugby league footballer

Transport
 Whyteleafe railway station, Surrey, National Rail station code

Other uses
 Why the lucky stiff, or simply why or _why, a computer programmer and artist
 World Hunger Year (WHY), a charity organization
 Why?, a satirical wiki and subproject of Uncyclopedia

See also
 Wai (disambiguation)
 Wye (disambiguation)
 Y (disambiguation)